Michel Batista (born 14 November 1977) is a Cuban weightlifter. He competed at the 2000 Summer Olympics and the 2004 Summer Olympics.

References

1977 births
Living people
Cuban male weightlifters
Olympic weightlifters of Cuba
Weightlifters at the 2000 Summer Olympics
Weightlifters at the 2004 Summer Olympics
Sportspeople from Camagüey
Pan American Games medalists in weightlifting
Pan American Games silver medalists for Cuba
Weightlifters at the 1999 Pan American Games
20th-century Cuban people
21st-century Cuban people